Silvano Montevecchi (31 March 1938 – 27 September 2013) was a Roman Catholic bishop.

Ordained to the priesthood in 1962, Montevecchi was named bishop of the Diocese of Ascoli Piceno, Italy, in 1997 where he died in office in 2013.

Notes

1938 births
2013 deaths
Bishops in le Marche